Yannick Daniel Jacques Makota Ngalle (born 20 January 1992) is a French footballer who plays as a forward for Eccellenza Apulia club Manfredonia.

Career

Club career

Makota started his career with the reserves of French Ligue 1 side Nancy. After that, he signed for Market Drayton Town in the English eighth division. In 2014, Makota signed for Portuguese second division club Sporting da Covilhã after trialing for Shrewsbury Town in the English third division. In 2015, he signed for French fifth division team Pays d'Aix. In 2017, he signed for Francs Borains in the Belgisn fourth division. In 2018, Makota signed for Macedonian outfit Pobeda. In 2019, he signed for Jeunesse in Luxembourg.

Before the second half of 2019/20, he signed for Omani side Saham but left due to the COVID-19 pandemic. In 2020, Makota signed for Bisceglie in the Italian third division, where he made 20 league appearances and scored 3 goals. On 13 December 2020, he debuted for Bisceglie during a 1–3 loss to Catanzaro. On 20 December 2020, Makota scored his first goal for Bisceglie during a 1–2 loss to Virtus Francavilla. In 2021, he signed for Israeli second division club Hapoel Umm al-Fahm.

International career

Dakota represented Cameroon at the 2011 FIFA U-20 World Cup.

References

External links
 
 Yannick Makota at playmakerstats.com

French expatriate footballers
French expatriate sportspeople in Portugal
French expatriate sportspeople in Italy
French expatriate sportspeople in Luxembourg
French expatriate sportspeople in England
French expatriate sportspeople in Belgium
French expatriate sportspeople in Israel
French expatriate sportspeople in North Macedonia
Cameroonian expatriate sportspeople in England
Cameroonian expatriate sportspeople in Portugal
Cameroonian expatriate sportspeople in Israel
Cameroonian expatriate sportspeople in Italy
Cameroonian expatriate sportspeople in Belgium
French footballers
Footballers from Lyon
S.C. Covilhã players
Pays d'Aix FC players
FK Pobeda players
A.S. Bisceglie Calcio 1913 players
Serie C players
Luxembourg National Division players
Macedonian First Football League players
Liga Portugal 2 players
Cameroonian footballers
Championnat National 3 players
Championnat National 2 players
1992 births
Living people
Expatriate footballers in Italy
Expatriate footballers in Luxembourg
Association football forwards
French sportspeople of Cameroonian descent
Cameroonian expatriate footballers
Expatriate footballers in Oman
Expatriate footballers in Israel
Expatriate footballers in Belgium
Expatriate footballers in England
Expatriate footballers in Portugal
Expatriate footballers in North Macedonia
Francs Borains players